Knower House is a historic home located at Guilderland in Albany County, New York.  It was built about 1800 and is a two-story frame house in the Georgian Colonial style. It accentuates a centroidal entrance and second story Palladian window.  While occupied by Benjamin Knower, future New York Governor William L. Marcy married Cornelia Knower at the house in 1824.

It was listed on the National Register of Historic Places in 1982.

References

Houses completed in 1800
Houses on the National Register of Historic Places in New York (state)
Georgian architecture in New York (state)
Houses in Albany County, New York
National Register of Historic Places in Albany County, New York